Vegeta is a character in Dragon Ball media.

Vegeta may also refer to:
Vegeta (condiment), produced by the company Podravka
Vegeta (software), HTTP load testing tool
King Vegeta, a character in Dragon Ball media and father of Vegeta in the story
Vegeta Jr., a character in the Dragon Ball universe and descendant of Vegeta in the story
Ulmus × hollandica 'Vegeta' (Chichester Elm)
Ulmus × hollandica 'Vegeta' (Huntingdon Elm)